Jamie Paul Allen (born 25 May 1995) is a Montserratian professional footballer who plays as a forward for AFC Telford United.

Club career

Fleetwood Town
Allen started his career with Fleetwood Town, making his Football League debut in 2013. He had loan spells with non-league Barrow and AFC Fylde, before being released in the summer of 2015, having made five appearances and scoring once.

Southport
Southport signed Allen soon after his release. He scored four goals in his first season.

Dover Athletic
Following Southport's relegation in the 2016–17 season, Allen joined National League side Dover Athletic for an undisclosed fee. Allen made his debut for the club on 5 August 2017, in an opening day 1–0 away victory over Hartlepool United in which he scored the game's only goal.

FC Halifax Town
On 9 July 2019, Allen signed for FC Halifax Town after cancelling his contract with Dover by mutual consent. On 9 June 2022, Allen signed a new contract with the club to take him through to the 2022–23 season. On 24 August 2022, Allen was announced to have left the club by mutual consent following his return from Love Island.

AFC Telford United
On 29 August 2022, Allen signed for National League North club AFC Telford United on a one-year deal.

International career
	
Allen was called up by Montserrat in November 2019 and made his debut against El Salvador on 16 November 2019.

Style of play
Allen can play as either a winger or as a striker. He is known for his electric pace.

Personal life
In July 2022, Allen became a contestant on the eighth series of ITV2's Love Island. At the time of filming, Allen was contracted to National League side Halifax. His club said that "the matter will be reviewed on his return." He was dumped from the villa alongside fellow contestant Danica Taylor on day 51.

References

1995 births
Living people
Footballers from Wigan
Montserratian footballers
Montserrat international footballers
English footballers
English people of Montserratian descent
Association football forwards
Fleetwood Town F.C. players
Barrow A.F.C. players
AFC Fylde players
Stalybridge Celtic F.C. players
Southport F.C. players
Dover Athletic F.C. players
FC Halifax Town players
AFC Telford United players
English Football League players
National League (English football) players
Love Island (2015 TV series) contestants